Disphragis vivida is a moth of the family Notodontidae. It is found in Costa Rica.

References

Moths described in 1910
Notodontidae